Silver is the 25th anniversary studio album by American country singer Johnny Cash and his 62nd album overall, released on Columbia Records in 1979. It peaked at #28 on the Billboard albums chart. "(Ghost) Riders in the Sky" peaked at #2 on the singles chart; the two other singles, "Bull Rider" and "I'll Say It's True" (with George Jones on background vocals), reached #66 and #42, respectively. Recordings of "Cocaine Blues" had previously appeared on At Folsom Prison and Now, There Was a Song!, under the title "Transfusion Blues" on the latter. The album was produced by Brian Ahern, who controversially introduced digital elements into the songs to the disapproval of some listeners. This is the last album that featured bassist Marshall Grant, longtime Cash collaborator in Tennessee Two. He departed from Cash's band the following year.

Silver was re-released in 2002 through Legacy Recordings, with remakes of two early Cash songs, "I Still Miss Someone" and "I Got Stripes," as bonus tracks; both are duets with George Jones.

Track listing

Personnel
 Johnny Cash - vocals, acoustic guitar
 Marshall Grant - bass
 W.S. Holland - drums
 Bob Wootton - electric guitar
 Jack Routh, Jerry Hensley - electric guitar, acoustic guitar
 Jack Clement - acoustic guitar
 Brian Ahern - acoustic guitar, Earthwood bass, 6-string bass, percussion
 Earl Ball, Charles Cochran - piano
 Jack Hale, Bob Lewin - trumpet
 Ricky Skaggs - fiddle
 Bob Johnson - mandocello
 Mark Morris - percussion
 Alisa Jones - Hammer dulcimer
 George Jones, Jack Wesley Routh, June Carter Cash, Helen Carter, Anita Carter, Jan Howard - backing vocals

Production
Original recording produced by: Brian Ahern
Recorded at Jack Clement Recording Studio and Enactroc Studios
Engineers: Billy Sherrill & Harold Lee, Brian Ahern and Donivan Cowart
Produced for reissue by: Al Quaglieri
Mastered by: Seth Roster at Sony Music Studios, New York
Tracks 11 and 12 Mixed by: Chris Theis at Sony Music Studios, New York
Legacy A&R: Steve Berkowitz
Project Designer: John Jackson
A&R Coordinator: Darren Salmieri
Art Direction: Howard Fritzson
Design: Randall Martin
Photography: Urve Kuusik/Sony Music Archives, spine sheet: Norman Seeff (from original LP)
Packaging Manager: John Christiana

Charts
Album - Billboard (United States)

Singles - Billboard (United States)

References

External links
 Luma Electronic entry on Silver

Silver
Silver
Albums produced by Brian Ahern (producer)
Silver